Mangammagari Manavadu is a 1984 Telugu-language drama film, produced by S. Gopala Reddy under the Bhargav Art Productions banner and directed by Kodi Ramakrishna. It stars Nandamuri Balakrishna, Bhanumathi Ramakrishna, Suhasini Charuhasan  and music composed by K. V. Mahadevan. The film is a remake of Tamil movie Man Vasanai (1983).

Plot
The film begins in a village where Mangamma an indomitable woman resides with her valiant grandson Veeranna. The village feuds with adjacent whose forefront is bloodthirsty Basavaiah. Chantabbai the son-in-law of Mangamma always brings off Basavaiah in the bullfight which inflames him. Mangamma & Chantabbai’s families holds conflicts for a long time. However, Veeranna darlings his cousin Malli who wins over their rift, and the elders decide the wedlock. Parallelly, Chantabbai maintains an adulterous fling with a sly Chintamani, her brother Chandarraju's passion for Malli. So, Chantabbai kicks them out when Chintamani entices Basavaiah and they all conspire on eve of the bullfight festival. 

At that point, Basavaiah incites drunkard Chantabbai to knit his daughter whoever beats his bull which Chandarraju does by anesthetizing it. As a result, Chantabbai severs himself from the nullification of the bet. After a while, Basavaiah mandates to surrender Malli but they drive away by the roaring of Mangamma and the complete village is forwards to perform the alliance of Veeranna & Malli. Forthwith, Veeranna proceeds to collect wedding accessories on his way back he is backstabbed by Basavaiah and declared dead. 

Being cognizant of it, Malli turns insane to save her Brahmachari benevolent teacher letters in Veeranna's name. 1 year later, Malli truly receives a letter from Veeranna that he is arriving the next morning and she is on cloud nine. Anyhow, she collapses after witnessing Veeranna landing with a Punjabi girl whom everyone supposes he has espoused her. Then, Veeranna spins back while under the attack he assumed that Basavaiah's men are slain by him. Due to fear of sentence, he absconded and enrolled in the army. 

Whereupon, he befriends a soldier Azim Singh who died while shielding him in a battle and entrusting his sister's responsibility to Veeranna. Now, Mangamma decides that Veeranna should splice the Punjabi girl. Knowing the current state, the Punjabi girl is about to quit when Malli bars, decorates her as a bride and attempts suicide. Just as, she is abducted by Basavaiah & Chandarraju. At last, Mangamma & Veeranna cease the baddies when the Punjabi girl sacrifices her life for Mangamma. Finally, the movie ends on a happy note with the marriage of Veeranna & Malli.

Cast
 Nandamuri Balakrishna as Veeranna	
 Bhanumathi Ramakrishna as Mangamma
 Suhasini Charuhasan as Malli
 Gollapudi Maruthi Rao as Brahmachari Master 
 Gokina Rama Rao as Chantabbai
 Raavi Kondala Rao
 Yeleswaram Ranga as Basavaiah
Telephone Satyanarayana as President Rayudu 
 Balaji as Chandar Raju
 Anitha as Annapurna 
 Y. Vijaya as  Chintamani

Soundtrack

Music composed by K. V. Mahadevan. Lyrics were written by C. Narayana Reddy. Music released on AVM Audio Company.

Box office
The film was a major success at the box office and celebrated a silver jubilee. It was the first 100-day film for Nandamuri Balakrishna as solo hero. The film was his breakthrough as lead actor. It ran for 100 days in Karnataka and 565 days in Hyderabad, making it the longest running Telugu film at the time, until the release of Pokiri in 2006.

References

External links
 

1984 films
1980s Telugu-language films
Films directed by Kodi Ramakrishna
Films scored by K. V. Mahadevan
Telugu remakes of Tamil films